Connor Milne (born 1994) is a Scottish international lawn and indoor bowler.

Bowls career
In 2019, Milne was selected for the European Bowls Championships, where he won two silver medals in the pairs and team events.

In January 2020, he won the Scottish Indoor National title bowling for the Turriff Bowls Club, defeating Colin Walker in the final. 

He made his indoor debut at the World Championships during the 2021 World Indoor Bowls Championship.

References

Scottish male bowls players
Living people
1994 births